Dholka Taluka is a taluka of Ahmedabad District, India. Its administrative centre is the village of Dholka.

Villages
1. Badarkha
1.(a)Mandarpura
2. Saroda
2.(a)Ridpura
3. Chandisar
3.(a)Dhunjipura
3.(d)Kodayipura
4. Kelia Vasna/Vasna Kelia
5. Chaloda
6. Sikhdi
7. Singhrej
8. Ranoda
9. Jalalpur Vajifa
10. Rajpur
11. Ambaliyara
12. Sathal
13. Lana
14. Siyavada
15. Kalyanpura
16. Valthera
16.(a)Bhagwanpura
17. Jalalpura/Godhneswar
18. Khanpur
19. Mujpur
20. Rampur
21. Khatripura
22. Sahij
23. Ambethi
24. Trasad
25. Bhetavada
26. Nesda
27. Dadusar
28. Sarandi
29. Begva
30. Kariyana
31. Kadipura
32. Ambareli
33. Paldi
34. Pisavada
35. Anghari
36. Virpur
37. Vautha
38. Girand
39. Virdi
40. Ingoli
41. Kauka
42. Kaliyapura
43. Kharati
44. Koth
44.(a)Taparpura
45. Rupgadh
46. Simej
47. Ganesar
48. Ganol
49. Raipur
50. Gholi
51. Kesargadh
52. Arnej
53. Bhurkhi
54. Gundi
54.(a)Laxmipura
55. Javaraj
56. Vajalka
57. Bhombhli
58. Vataman
59. Rampura
60. Anandpura
61. Varna
62. Jhakda
63. Naniboru
64. Saragvada
65. Uteliya
66. Loliya
67. Samani
68. Bhodad
69. Motiboru
70. Maflipura252555
 
71. Dholka:- The Village with Historical Significance. Mostly Famous for Minal Devi justice at the lake "Malav Talav". The justice done by not curving the lake into entire perfect circle quoting "Nyay Jovo hoy to Juvo"

References

Talukas of Gujarat
Ahmedabad district